Sight Unseen may refer to:
 Sight Unseen (novel), a 1969 novel by Audrey Erskine Lindop
 Sight Unseen (play), a 1991 play by Donald Margulies
 Sight Unseen, a 2005 novel by Robert Goddard (novelist)
 "Sight Unseen", a song by Rise Against from the 2008 album Appeal to Reason
 "Sight Unseen" (Charmed), a 2000 episode of the television series Charmed
 "Sight Unseen", a 2002 episode of the television series Stargate SG-1
 Sight Unseen (audio drama), an audio drama on the Wondery podcast network
 Sight Unseen, a 1999 book by Georgina Kleege